Faustino Reyes López (born 4 April 1975 in Marchena, Seville) is a former boxer from Spain, who represented his native country at the 1992 Summer Olympics in Barcelona, Spain. There he won the silver medal in the featherweight division (– 57 kg), after being defeated in the final by Germany's Andreas Tews.

Olympic results 
Defeated Brian Carr (Great Britain) 22-10
Defeated Somluck Kamsing (Thailand) 24-15
Defeated Eddy Suarez (Cuba) 17-7
Defeated Ramazan Palyani (Unified Team) 14-9
Lost to Andreas Tews (Germany) 9-16

External links
  Spanish Olympic Committee

1975 births
Living people
People from Campiña de Morón y Marchena
Sportspeople from the Province of Seville
Featherweight boxers
Boxers at the 1992 Summer Olympics
Olympic boxers of Spain
Olympic silver medalists for Spain
Olympic medalists in boxing
Spanish male boxers
Medalists at the 1992 Summer Olympics
20th-century Spanish people
21st-century Spanish people